Nevsha (Bulgarian: Невша) is a village in north-eastern Bulgaria. It is located in the municipality of Vetrino, Varna Province.

As of September 2015 the village has a population of 554.

References

Villages in Varna Province